Rubberface is a 1981 television film made for CBC television starring Jim Carrey. Originally titled Introducing... Janet, it was changed to Rlghe for the video release after Carrey's success.

Plot
A funny schoolgirl (Adah Glassbourg) becomes friends with a stand-up comedian called Tony Maroni (Jim Carrey) who is struggling with his career.

Home media
The film was released on DVD on January 23, 2007.

References

External links
 
 

1981 films
Canadian comedy films
1981 comedy films
Films about entertainers
CBC Television original films
English-language Canadian films
Canadian comedy television films
1980s Canadian films